Kim Jin-Soo is a chemist, biologist, and entrepreneur. He was CEO and CSO, ToolGen, Inc., is a professor in the Department of Chemistry of Seoul National University and director of the Center for Genome Engineering. His research team has developed and improved several types of programmable nucleases, specifically zinc finger nucleases (ZFNs), TAL effector nucleases (TALENs), and RNA-guided engineered nucleases (RGENs). In 2018, he was a Clarivate Analytics Highly Cited Researcher in the cross-field category and in the biology and biochemistry category in 2019.

Education
Kim studied chemistry at Seoul National University from 1983 and received a B.S. in 1987 and M.S. in 1989. He received a Ph.D. from University of Wisconsin-Madison in 1994.

Career
He first worked as a research associate at the Howard Hughes Medical Institute and Massachusetts Institute of Technology for three years. In 1997, he became a principal investigator at the Samsung Biomedical Research Institute. In 1999, he left that position to be the CEO and CSO of ToolGen; a company he founded. ToolGen is a biotech company based on CRISPR technology focusing on human therapies, and molecular breeding in plants and animals. In 2005, the company was among the Top 10 Biotech Companies to Watch in Asia at the Pacific Rim Forum/China Council for the Promotion of Industrial Trade. In that same year, he left his CEO position and started working at Seoul National University as an assistant professor, then associate and then full professor. From 2014, he became the founding director of the Center for Genome Engineering under the Institute for Basic Science (IBS).

CRISPR-Cas9 is a widely used genetic tool but testing its accuracy genome wide is difficult.  In 2015, Kim's IBS Center, Seoul National University, and ToolGen jointly published a paper in Nature Methods outlining their technique named Digenome-seq which locates on-target and off-target sequences in CRISPR-Cas9. Dignome-seq complements other genome wide off target analysis assays such as CIRCLE-seq and guide-seq, which are performed in vitro and in cellulo, respectively. He has continued to research increasing the accuracy of the process.

Awards and honors
 2019–2020: Highly Cited Researcher in biology and biochemistry category
 2018: Highly Cited Researcher in cross-field category, Clarivate Analytics
 2017: Asan Award in Medicine, Asan Foundation
 2015: Scientist of the Year Award
 2014: Outstanding National R&D Performances in 2014, Ministry of Science and ICT
 2004: Scientist of the Month, National Research Foundation of Korea and Ministry of Science and Technology
 2003: 38th Invention Day Award, Korea Invention Promotion Association

See also
 Feng Zhang
 J. Keith Joung

References

External links
Jin-Soo KIM - Google Scholar
김진수 - 인물검색 (Korean)
Genome Engineering Laboratory - Center for Genome Engineering - Seoul National University

Academic staff of KAIST
1964 births
Living people
KAIST alumni
Institute for Basic Science
University of Wisconsin–Madison alumni
South Korean scientists